Roger de Somery  inherited the feudal barony of Dudley in 1235. In 1262, Roger started the re-fortification of Dudley Castle, which had been slighted by order of King Henry II after a rebellion in 1173-1174. Roger married twice and died in 1272.

Biography
Roger de Somery was the son of Ralph de Somery (d 1210) and Margaret le Gras (liv 1247), feudal baron of Dudley. He inherited the barony in 1235. In 1253, the king sent Roger on an expedition to Gascony to help quell a rebellion. In 1262, Roger began to re-fortify Dudley Castle, which had been slighted by order of King Henry II after the revolt of 1173–74. However, as he did not have a licence from the king to rebuild the castle, he was ordered to stop the construction work. A licence was subsequently obtained and refortification resumed although the castle was not finished in his lifetime. Roger married twice, first to Nichola Albini (daughter of William de Albini) and secondly to Amabel Chacombe. He died in 1272.

By his wife Nichola, he had the following children:
Ralph de Somery, predeceased his father, died without male heirs (d 1273-1282)
Margaret de Somery m Ralph Cromwell and Ralph Basset
Joan de Somery m John le Strange
Mable de Somery m Walter de Sully
Matilda/Maud de Somery m Henry de Erdington 

By his wife Amabil he had 2 sons:
Roger de Somery
Percival de Somery

References

1272 deaths
13th-century English people
People from Dudley
English feudal barons